Dalandanan is one of the highly developed barangays in Valenzuela, Metro Manila, Philippines. It was named after the impressive line of dalandan trees that used to distinguish the area.

Dalandanan houses the new Valenzuela City Astrodome, Valenzuela Emergency Hospital and Dialysis Center, and Valenzuela City Science High School.

It boasts of different business industries like banking and finance (Bank of the Philippine Islands, BDO, Bank of Commerce, and Eastwest Bank), retail (Puregold Valenzuela, Wilcon Depot), pyrotechnic (Victory Fireworks), and biotech and pharmaceuticals (Scheele Laboratories).

The Iglesia ni Cristo Locale of Malinta chapel is also located along MacArthur Highway.

The now-defunct Manila-Dagupan Railway opened in 1892 and traversed the barrios of Marulas, Caruhatan, Malinta, Dalandanan and Malanday, with the station being in Dalandanan.

Education
The barangay has 3 public educational facilities for elementary, and high school.

References

External links

Dalandanan, Valenzuela
List of Public School – Valenzuela City

Barangays of Metro Manila
Valenzuela, Metro Manila